Psilogramma argos is a moth of the  family Sphingidae. It is known from Western Australia, the Northern Territory and northern Queensland.

Adults have long, narrow pale grey wings, with black markings. The abdomen is grey, with no dark dorsal line.

The larvae feed on Gyrocarpus americanus. They are green with a strong curved horn on the tail pointing backwards, a series of diagonal white stripes on the sides and dark marks on the back of each segment. Full-grown larvae are about 80 mm long. Mature larvae leave the food plant and forms a cell of silk under the soil in which pupation takes place.

Etymology
The species name is derived from the Greek word argos (meaning white) referring to the pale colour of the adults.

References

Psilogramma
Moths described in 1999
Endemic fauna of Australia